Hypsipetes malaccensis may refer to:

 Eastern bearded greenbul, a species of bird found in Equatorial Africa
 Streaked bulbul, a species of bird found on the Malay Peninsula, Sumatra, and Borneo